Paradise Township is a township in east-central Lancaster County, Pennsylvania, United States. The population was 5,696 at the 2020 census.

Geography
Unincorporated communities in the township include Paradise, Leahman Place, Harristown, Vintage, Kinzers, Bellemont, and Iva.

Demographics

At the 2000 census there were 4,698 people, 1,554 households, and 1,226 families living in the township.  The population density was 252.4 people per square mile (97.4/km).  There were 1,600 housing units at an average density of 85.9/sq mi (33.2/km).  The racial makeup of the township was 98.36% White, 0.62% African American, 0.11% Native American, 0.11% Asian, 0.06% Pacific Islander, 0.17% from other races, and 0.57% from two or more races. Hispanic or Latino of any race were 0.72%.

There were 1,554 households, 35.5% had children under the age of 18 living with them, 68.9% were married couples living together, 6.9% had a female householder with no husband present, and 21.1% were non-families. 17.7% of households were made up of individuals, and 6.4% were one person aged 65 or older.  The average household size was 2.99 and the average family size was 3.42.

The age distribution was 30.2% under the age of 18, 9.2% from 18 to 24, 25.8% from 25 to 44, 21.7% from 45 to 64, and 13.0% 65 or older.  The median age was 34 years. For every 100 females, there were 103.0 males.  For every 100 females age 18 and over, there were 100.1 males.

The median household income was $42,047 and the median family income  was $44,575. Males had a median income of $32,366 versus $21,755 for females. The per capita income for the township was $16,631.  About 5.8% of families and 8.4% of the population were below the poverty line, including 11.4% of those under age 18 and 9.5% of those age 65 or over.

References

External links

Populated places established in 1710
Townships in Lancaster County, Pennsylvania
Townships in Pennsylvania
1710 establishments in Pennsylvania